Goodacre is a surname. Notable people with the surname include:

Bill Goodacre (1951-2019), Canadian politician from British Columbia
Chelsea Goodacre (born 1993), American softball player
Geoff Goodacre (1927–2004), Australian hurdler
Glenna Goodacre (1939–2020), American sculptor who designed the obverse of the U.S. Sacagawea dollar
Hugh Goodacre (died 1553), English Protestant clergyman, briefly Church of Ireland Archbishop of Armagh and Primate of Ireland
Jill Goodacre (born 1965), American actress and model
Mark Goodacre (born 1967), New Testament scholar 
Reg Goodacre (1908–1998), English footballer
Ross Goodacre (born 1978), New Zealand football player
Roy Goodacre, (born 1967), British microbiologist and  chemist
Sara Goodacre, British geneticist and arachnologist
Walter Goodacre (1856–1938), British businessman and amateur astronomer
William Goodacre (1873–1948), English cricketer

See also
Goodacre (crater), lunar impact crater
God's Acre